The Colombia national under-18 basketball team is a national basketball team of Colombia, administered by the Federación Colombiana de Baloncesto.

It represents the country in international under-18 (under age 18) basketball competitions.

See also
Colombia men's national basketball team
Colombia men's national under-17 basketball team
Colombia women's national under-19 basketball team

References

External links
 Archived records of Colombia team participations

B
Men's national under-18 basketball teams